Jørgen Moritzen (13 October 1918 – 28 July 2002) was a Danish weightlifter. He competed at the 1948 Summer Olympics and the 1952 Summer Olympics.

References

1918 births
2002 deaths
Danish male weightlifters
Olympic weightlifters of Denmark
Weightlifters at the 1948 Summer Olympics
Weightlifters at the 1952 Summer Olympics
Sportspeople from Copenhagen